Warwick Square is a garden square in the Pimlico district of London SW1. Buildings fronting, save for a church, are listed Grade II on the National Heritage List for England. The private gardens at the centre of the square are Grade II listed on the Register of Historic Parks and Gardens.

Layout and architecture
An outlier (anomaly) is No.33 which is beyond the south corner of the rectangle - it has views of parts of the square from its front.

The group of four K6 telephone boxes (deemed) on Belgrave Road next to the garden wall of No.1 are listed Grade II.

No.s 1–23, 26–33, 49–80 which are the fronting buildings save for a church, have national protection and recognition (that is by statutory listed building status); they are in the initial, mainstream category, Grade II.

The square began with roads and pipes in 1843 and the terraces around it were completed in the next few years. No.33 was built from 1860 to 1866 by George Morgan as a studio and mansion. No.66 was Cubitt's home and office at the time he was developing the square. It was converted into 5 apartments in 2018.

References

1843 in London
Grade II listed houses in the City of Westminster
Grade II listed parks and gardens in London
Houses completed in the 19th century
Pimlico
Thomas Cubitt buildings
Communal gardens
Garden squares in London
Squares in the City of Westminster